Sportsklubben Nord is a Norwegian sports club from Karmøy. Founded in 1932, it has sections for association football and team handball.

The men's football team currently plays in the Fourth Division, the fifth tier of Norwegian football. It is coached by Simon Balm.

References

 Official site 

Football clubs in Norway
Sport in Rogaland
Karmøy
Association football clubs established in 1932
1932 establishments in Norway